Johanson is a Scandinavian patronymic surname meaning "son of Johan". Including its variant spellings, it is a common surname in Norway, Sweden, and Denmark.

 Al R. Johanson (1899-1964), American lawyer and politician
 Anton Johanson (1877–1952), Swedish footballer
 Arvid Johanson (1929–2013), Norwegian politician
 Bryan Johanson (b. 1951), American musician and composer
 Chris Johanson (b. 1968), American artist
 Donald Johanson (b. 1943), American paleoanthropologist
 Eric Johanson, American blues rock singer, guitarist, and songwriter
 George Johanson (b. 1928), American artist
 Herbert Johanson (1884–1964), Estonian architect
 Jai Johanny Johanson (b. 1944), American musician
 Jay-Jay Johanson (b. 1969), Swedish musician, singer, songwriter
 John Peter Johanson (1865-1937), American Medal of Honor recipient
 Klara Johanson (1875–1948), Swedish writer
 Sue Johanson (b. 1930), Canadian writer, public speaker, registered nurse, sex educator

See also
 Johansson
 Johansen
 Johannsen
 Johnson

Patronymic surnames
Surnames from given names